The Council of Europe Convention on Access to Official Documents, usually known as the Tromsø Convention, was signed on 18 June 2009 in the Norwegian city of Tromsø. It entered into force on 1 December 2020 after it had been ratified by the Verkhovna Rada of Ukraine on 20 May 2020. 13 states have ratified the Convention and 7 additional states have signed it. In addition to Ukraine, it is obligatory for Sweden, Bosnia and Herzegovina, Estonia, Finland, Norway, Moldova, Croatia, Montenegro, Hungary, Lithuania, Iceland, Armenia, Albania.

The Tromsø Convention is the first binding international legal instrument to recognize a general right of access to official documents held by public authorities. It is a multilateral agreement through which the opportunities for citizens to access public information are increased. It lays down a right of access to official documents. Limitations on this right are only permitted in order to protect certain interests like national security, defense or privacy.

See also
Freedom of information legislation

References

Treaties concluded in 2009

Freedom of information legislation

Treaties of Estonia
Treaties of Finland

Treaties of Lithuania

Treaties of Sweden
Treaties of Ukraine

Council of Europe treaties
Treaties entered into force in 2020
Treaties of Bosnia and Herzegovina
Treaties of Hungary
Treaties of Montenegro
2009 in Norway